Sergei Alexandrovich Belov (23 January 1944 – 3 October 2013) was a Russian professional basketball player, most noted for playing for CSKA Moscow and the senior Soviet Union national basketball team. He is considered to be one of the best European basketball players of all time, and was given the honour of lighting the Olympic Cauldron with the Olympic flame during the 1980 Summer Olympics opening ceremony, in Moscow.

In 1991, Belov was named by FIBA as the Best FIBA Player ever. He became the first international player to be inducted into the Naismith Memorial Basketball Hall of Fame on 11 May 1992. He was also inducted into the FIBA Hall of Fame in 2007 and was named one of the 50 Greatest EuroLeague Contributors in 2008.

Early life
Sergei Belov was born in the village of Nashchyokovo, Shegarsky District, Tomsk Oblast, Soviet Union. In 1968, he became an Honoured Master of Sports of the USSR. He became an Honoured Coach of Russia in 1995, and served as President of the Russian Basketball Federation (1993–98).

Career
At the age of twenty, Belov made his debut in the USSR League, with the team of Uralmash Sverdlovsk, where he played from 1964 to 1967. He then played with CSKA Moscow for twelve years. With CSKA, he won the USSR League championship eleven times (1969, 1970, 1971, 1972, 1973, 1974, 1976, 1977, 1978, 1979, 1980), the USSR Cup twice (1972, 1973), and the EuroLeague twice, in 1969 and 1971.

As a member of the senior Soviet Union national basketball team, for nearly fourteen years (1967–1980), Belov helped them win a Summer Olympic Games gold medal in 1972, and three bronze medals in 1968, 1976, and 1980. He also helped them to become the FIBA World Cup champions in 1967 and 1974, and the EuroBasket champions in 1967, 1969, 1971, and 1979. He also won the Summer Universiade, in 1970, as well.

In the gold medal game of the 1972 Summer Olympics, Belov scored 20 points against the United States national basketball team, as the Soviet Union controversially defeated the USA, by a score of 51–50, to win the gold.

Later life
Belov was the head coach of CSKA Moscow, with whom he won the USSR League championship in 1982 and 1990. He was also the head coach of Ural Great Perm. With Ural Great Perm, he won the Russian Championship title in both 2001 and 2002, the Russian Cup in 2004, and the North European League championship in 2001.

As the head coach of the senior men's Russian national basketball team, he won silver medals at both the 1994 FIBA World Championship and the 1998 FIBA World Championship, and the bronze medal at the EuroBasket 1997. He was also Russia's head coach at the EuroBasket 1995 and the EuroBasket 1999.

Belov died on 3 October 2013, in Perm, Russia.

Legacy
Asteroid 296638 Sergeibelov, discovered by Timur Kryachko in 2009, was named in his memory. The official  was published by the Minor Planet Center on 16 March 2014.

Awards and accomplishments
Honoured Master of Sports of the USSR
Order of the Badge of Honour
Medal "For Distinguished Labour"
As a player:
2 × EuroLeague Champion: 1969, 1971
3 × EuroLeague Finals Top Scorer: 1970, 1971, 1973
11 × USSR League Champion: 1969, 1970, 1971, 1972, 1973, 1974, 1976, 1977, 1978, 1979, 1980
2 × USSR Cup Winner: 1972, 1973
Summer Universiade:
: 1970
Summer Olympic Games:
: 1972
: 1968, 1976, 1980
FIBA World Cup:
: 1967, 1974
: 1978
: 1970 (MVP)
FIBA EuroBasket:
: 1967, 1969 (MVP), 1971, 1979
: 1975, 1977
: 1973
FIBA's 50 Greatest Players: 1991 (Voted #1)
Naismith Memorial Basketball Hall of Fame: 1992
FIBA Hall of Fame: 2007
50 Greatest EuroLeague Contributors: 2008
As a head coach:
2 × USSR League Champion: 1982, 1990
FIBA Order of Merit: 1995
2 × Russian Championship Champion: 2001, 2002
Russian Cup Winner: 2004
North European League Champion: 2001
FIBA World Cup:
: 1994, 1998
FIBA EuroBasket:
: 1997

References and notes

External links

 
 
 Euroleague.net Article On Belov
 Euroleague.net 50 Greatest Contributors Profile
 
 Interbasket.net Profile
 
 
 FIBA.com Profile
 Euroleague & International Statistics

1944 births
2013 deaths
Armed Forces sports society athletes
Basketball players at the 1968 Summer Olympics
Basketball players at the 1972 Summer Olympics
Basketball players at the 1976 Summer Olympics
Basketball players at the 1980 Summer Olympics
BC Ural Yekaterinburg players
FIBA EuroBasket-winning players
FIBA Hall of Fame inductees
FIBA World Championship-winning players
Honoured Masters of Sport of the USSR
Medalists at the 1968 Summer Olympics
Medalists at the 1972 Summer Olympics
Medalists at the 1976 Summer Olympics
Medalists at the 1980 Summer Olympics
Naismith Memorial Basketball Hall of Fame inductees
Olympic basketball players of the Soviet Union
Olympic bronze medalists for the Soviet Union
Olympic cauldron lighters
Olympic gold medalists for the Soviet Union
Olympic medalists in basketball
PBC CSKA Moscow coaches
PBC CSKA Moscow players
PBC Ural Great coaches
People from Tomsk Oblast
Russian basketball coaches
Russian men's basketball players
Shooting guards
Soviet basketball coaches
Soviet men's basketball players
1967 FIBA World Championship players
1970 FIBA World Championship players
1974 FIBA World Championship players
1978 FIBA World Championship players
Universiade medalists in basketball
Universiade gold medalists for the Soviet Union
Medalists at the 1970 Summer Universiade
Sportspeople from Tomsk Oblast